Caenonetria is a monotypic genus of Indonesian dwarf spiders containing the single species, Caenonetria perdita. It was first described by Alfred Frank Millidge & A. Russell-Smith in 1992, and has only been found in Indonesia.

See also
 List of Linyphiidae species

References

Linyphiidae
Monotypic Araneomorphae genera
Spiders of Asia